Dinictis is a genus of the Nimravidae, an extinct family of feliform mammalian carnivores, also known as "false saber-toothed cats".

Taxonomy 

Dinictis was named by American paleontologist Joseph Leidy in 1854. Its type is Dinictis felina. It was assigned to the Nimravidae by Leidy (1854); and to the Nimravinae by Flynn and Galiano (1982), Bryant (1991), and Martin (1998).

In a 2016 study, the genus was found to contain only the species Dinictis felina.

Description 
It was very similar to its close relative, Hoplophoneus. The shape of its skull is reminiscent of a felid skull rather than of the extremely short skull of the Machairodontinae. Compared with those of the more recent machairodonts, its upper canines were relatively small, but they nevertheless distinctly protruded from its mouth. Below the tips of the canines, its lower jaw spread out in the form of a lobe.

Dinictis walked plantigrade (flat-footed), unlike modern felids. It looked like a small leopard and evidently its mode of life was similar to that of a leopard. It was probably not so particular about its food as its descendants, since the reduction of its teeth was still in the early stages and Dinictis had not forgotten how to chew. In its own environment, it would have been a powerful predator.

Ecology 

It lived in the plains of North America with fossils found in Saskatchewan, Canada and Colorado, Montana, Nebraska, South Dakota, North Dakota, Wyoming, and Oregon in the United States. Dinictis likely evolved from an early Miacis-like ancestor that lived in the Paleocene.

References 

Benes, Josef. Prehistoric Animals and Plants. Pg. 204. Prague: Artua, 1979.

Nimravidae
Paleogene mammals of North America
White River Fauna
Eocene carnivorans
Oligocene feliforms
Aquitanian genus extinctions
Prehistoric carnivoran genera